Sanerivi "Sani" Sagala (born 24 August 1974), better known by his stage name Dei Hamo, is a New Zealand hip hop artist, producer and director.

Dei Hamo, which can be translated as "The Samoan", has won various awards for his chart-topping music and his first album First Edition, released in 2005. He lives in Mangere, Auckland.

Background 
Dei Hamo's musical career spans more than 15 years. He was part of the Proud hip hop tour and has worked with some of New Zealand's top musicians and performers, including Boh Runga, Tha Feelstyle and DJ Sammy B. He has supported a number of international acts including The Black Eyed Peas and Busta Rhymes.

Dei Hamo went to Aorere College, Papatoetoe in the late 1980s where he was first exposed to the hip hop genre. Hamo spent his days and nights perfecting his craft, later claiming to have written a song a day.

Having a passion for film and directing, in 2010 he was asked by a close friend Amy Raumati (also known as Lady Sheeq) to direct a music video for her. Dei Hamo agreed and has since directed music videos for other artists. He directs the music videos under his real name, Sani Sagala, as he aims to write and direct movies in the near future.

Music 
In 2004, Dei Hamo's first single "We Gon' Ride" spent five consecutive weeks at number one on New Zealand's music chart, and three months in the top 10. The track went platinum. It also reached the top 40 in Australia. Later singles have included "This Is My Life" and "Cry again", the latter containing lyrics from Split Enz's song "I Hope I Never" performed by Tim Finn.

Discography

Albums

Singles

Awards 

!scope="col"|
|-
| rowspan="3" | 2005
| Dei Hamo - First Edition
| New Zealand Music Awards - Breakthrough Artist of the Year
| 
| rowspan="3" style="text-align:center;" | 
|-
| Dei Hamo - "We Gon' Ride
| New Zealand Music Awards - Highest Selling New Zealand Single
| 
|-
| Chris Graham "We Gon' Ride" (Dei Hamo)
| New Zealand Music Awards - Best Music VIdeo
| 
|-
| rowspan="2" | 2005
| Dei Hamo - "We Gon' Ride"
| Pacific Music Awards - Best Pacific Male Artist
| 
| rowspan="2" style="text-align:center;" | 
|-
| Dei Hamo - "We Gon' Ride"
| Pacific Music Awards - Best Pacific Urban Artist
| 
|-
| rowspan="2" | 2006
| Dei Hamo - First Edition
| Pacific Music Awards - Best Pacific Male Artist
| 
| rowspan="2" style="text-align:center;" | 
|-
| Dei Hamo - First Edition
| Pacific Music Awards - Best Pacific Urban Artist
| 
|}

Videography (as director)
Music videos directed by Sani Sagala (Dei Hamo) include:

See also 
New Zealand hip hop

References

External links 
2005 interview in New Zealand Herald
Watch We Gon' Ride music video, NZ On Screen website
Photo & article at Eventpolynesia

New Zealand rappers
New Zealand people of Samoan descent
Living people
Pacific Music Award-winning artists
1975 births
People from Māngere